Peter Cookson (May 8, 1913 – January 6, 1990) was an American stage and film actor of the 1940s and 1950s. He was known for his collaborations with his wife, Beatrice Straight, an actress and member of the Whitney family.

Early life
Cookson was born on May 8, 1913 on a houseboat on the Willamette River in Milwaukie, Oregon to Gerald Cookson, a career British Army officer, and Helen Willis, a nurse.  Cookson attended the Pasadena Playhouse on a scholarship.

Career
Cookson appeared in the play The Heiress on Broadway in 1947, where he met his wife to-be, Beatrice Straight. He was also a producer and produced the play The Innocents on Broadway in 1950, starring his wife. Cookson's most famous stage role was of the love struck judge in Cole Porter's 1953 musical Can-Can in which he introduced the song "It's All Right With Me." "In interviews at the time, he said he was astonished at being given the part, as he had not sung for an audience since high school."

Cookson starred in several feature films during the 1940s, including G. I. Honeymoon (1945) and Fear, before moving exclusively to television during the following decade.

He was a founding member of The Actors Studio, as was his second wife Beatrice Straight.

Personal life
In 1937, Peter married Maureen Gray. Before their divorce in 1948, they had:
Peter Cookson Jr. (b. 1942)
Jane Copland (née Cookson)
Peter and Maureen separated in Spring 1947. They attempted a reconciliation in the Summer of 1947, renting a house in Denver. At that time, Cookson had an affair with actress Patricia Neal. His wife found out and left him.

In 1948, while starring in the Broadway production of The Heiress, an adaptation of Henry James's Washington Square, Cookson met Beatrice Straight (1914–2001), who he was acting opposite. Straight was the daughter of Dorothy Payne Whitney (1887–1968), of the Whitney family, and Willard Dickerman Straight (1880–1918), an investment banker and diplomat. Straight's step-father was Leonard Knight Elmhirst (1893–1974).  Cookson and Straight married in 1949, and had two children:
Gary Cookson, an actor.
Tony Cookson, writer and director of And You Thought Your Parents Were Weird (1991)
Cookson died in 1990 of bone cancer at his home in Southfield, Massachusetts. Beatrice died in 2001 from pneumonia in Northridge, Los Angeles at the age of eighty-six.

Published works
Henderson's Head (1973), a novel described as "sexually whiffy psychotic stuff" by Kirkus Reviews.
Pigeons, a comedy play later turned into a script in 1986.
Million Rosebuds (1978), a play written with the New Dramatists
Unique Species (1984), a play.

Filmography and credits

References

External links
 

1913 births
1990 deaths
American male film actors
People from Milwaukie, Oregon
Male actors from Oregon
20th-century American male actors
Deaths from bone cancer
Deaths from cancer in Massachusetts